Malden-on-Hudson (-), commonly known as Malden, is a hamlet (and census-designated place) in Ulster County, New York, United States. The population was 365 at the 2020 census.

The community of Malden is in the eastern part of the Town of Saugerties, north of the Village of Saugerties. There is a public boat launch on the Hudson River that is often used by the Malden Yacht Club, a group of local kayakers.

Geography
Malden is located at  (42.093279, -73.934804).

The community is on the west bank of the Hudson River.

Demographics

As of the census of 2000, there were 413 people, 153 households, and 106 families residing in the CDP.  The population density was 813.3 per square mile (312.7/km2).  There were 174 housing units at an average density of 342.7/sq mi (131.7/km2).  The racial makeup of the CDP was 93.95% White, 1.94% African American, 0.24% Native American, 0.48% Asian, 1.45% from other races, and 1.94% from two or more races. Hispanic or Latino of any race were 4.12% of the population.

There were 153 households, out of which 32.0% had children under the age of 18 living with them, 54.2% were married couples living together, 10.5% had a female householder with no husband present, and 30.7% were non-families. 26.1% of all households were made up of individuals, and 7.2% had someone living alone who was 65 years of age or older.  The average household size was 2.70 and the average family size was 3.32.

In the CDP, the population was spread out, with 27.1% under the age of 18, 9.4% from 18 to 24, 30.0% from 25 to 44, 24.5% from 45 to 64, and 9.0% who were 65 years of age or older.  The median age was 36 years. For every 100 females, there were 90.3 males.  For every 100 females age 18 and over, there were 98.0 males.

The median income for a household in the CDP was $43,438, and the median income for a family was $41,250. Males had a median income of $33,558 versus $18,333 for females. The per capita income for the CDP was $17,962.  About 6.4% of families and 5.5% of the population were below the poverty line, including none of those under age 18 and 27.0% of those age 65 or over.

References

Census-designated places in New York (state)
Census-designated places in Ulster County, New York
Hamlets in New York (state)
Saugerties, New York
Hamlets in Ulster County, New York
New York (state) populated places on the Hudson River